HMS Norfolk was a 74-gun third-rate ship of the line of the Royal Navy, and the second ship to bear the name. She was built by Adrian Hayes at Deptford Dockyard and launched on 8 December 1757. She was active during the Seven Years' War.

Service History

Her first commander was Captain Peircy Brett (later Commodore Brett) and she had a complement of 550 crew. Under Brett on 5 June 1758 she was part of the major British raid on St Malo (totalling around 50 ships).

Norfolk emulated her predecessor by reinforcing the West Indies, where she escorted a fleet that was transporting vital stores and six infantry regiments to that region.

In September 1758 command passed to Captain Robert Hughes and under Hughes in January 1759 a successful attack was made on Guadeloupe.

In September 1760 under Captain Richard Kempenfelt, she was part of the Siege of Pondicherry (1760).

On 10 February 1761 she took part in the capture of Mahe. On 24 September 1762 she was part of the Battle of Manila.

She became flagship of the Commander-In-Chief East Indies Station, Rear-Admiral Charles Steevens and his successor Vice-Admiral Samuel Cornish. Norfolk was decommissioned in 1764, after her return to Portsmouth was broken up in 1774.

Notable Commanders

Peircy Brett 1757 to 1758
Hyde Parker 1759 to 1760
Richard Kempenfelt 1760 to 1762
George Ourry 1762 to 1764

Notable Crew

Charles Steevens flag officer
Samuel Cornish flag officer

See also
 Battle of Manila (1762)

Notes

References

Lavery, Brian (2003) The Ship of the Line – Volume 1: The development of the battlefleet 1650–1850. Conway Maritime Press. .

External links

Ships of the line of the Royal Navy
Dublin-class ships of the line
1757 ships